The Reaction Engines Limited LAPCAT Configuration A2 (called the LAPCAT A2) is a design study for a hypersonic speed jet airliner intended to provide, long range, high capacity commercial transportation. 

The aircraft was designed, as part of the European Union-funded Long-Term Advanced Propulsion Concepts and Technologies (LAPCAT) programme, by the British aerospace engineering firm Reaction Engines Limited, who said it could be developed into a working aircraft within 25 years once there is market demand for it.

Development
The vehicle is intended to have about  range and good subsonic and supersonic speed fuel efficiency, thus avoiding the problems inherent in earlier supersonic aircraft. The top speed is projected to be Mach 5+. It calls for the use of liquid hydrogen as a fuel, which has twice the specific impulse of kerosene, and can be used to cool the vehicle and the air entering the engines via a precooler.
Alan Bond, managing director of Reaction Engines, said "Our work shows that it is possible technically; now it's up to the world to decide if it wants it."

The developers say it would be able to fly from Europe to Australia in under five hours, compared to around a complete day of travel with normal aircraft. The cost of a ticket is intended to be roughly business class level.

Design

Capabilities

According to Alan Bond, the A2 design could fly subsonically from Brussels International Airport into the North Atlantic then reaching Mach 5 across the North Pole and over the Pacific to Australia. The route described isn't a great circle, in order to minimise the travel time while avoiding flying supersonically over land, as there are concerns the sonic boom generated by travelling at supersonic speed could cause significant discomfort for people on the ground.

The  A2 design is much longer than conventional jets, but would be lighter than a Boeing 747. It could take off and land on current airport runways.

However, the A2 design does not have windows. The heat generated by the hypersonic airflow over the body puts constraints on window design which would make them too heavy. One solution Reaction Engines has proposed is to install flat panel displays, showing images of the scene outside.

Engines
The Scimitar engines use related technology to the company's earlier SABRE engine, which is intended for space launch, but here adapted for very long distance, very high speed travel.

Normally, as air enters a jet engine, it is compressed by the inlet, and thus heats up. It needs much more power to compress that heated air further by the engine's compressor section, which reduces the compressor's efficiency dramatically. Furthermore, this means that high-speed engines need to be made of materials that can survive extremely high temperatures. In practice, this inevitably makes the engines heavier and also reduces the amount of fuel that can be burned, to avoid melting the gas turbine section of the engine. This in turn reduces thrust at high speed.

The key design feature for the Scimitar engines is the precooler, which is a heat exchanger that transfers the heat from the incoming air into the hydrogen fuel. This greatly cools the air, which allows the engines to burn more fuel even at very high speed, and allows the engines to be made of lighter, but more heat susceptible, materials such as light alloys. The engine inlet diffuser also has to slow the incoming air to subsonic speeds because if the air moved through the precooler and compressor at supersonic speeds, it would cause damage to them.

The rest of the engine is described as having high-bypass (4:1) turbofan engine features to give it good efficiency and subsonic (quiet) exhaust velocity at low speeds. Unlike SABRE, the A2's Scimitar engine would not have rocket engine features.

Specifications (LAPCAT A2)

See also

References

External links

 .

Hypersonic aircraft
Hydrogen-powered aircraft
Ramjet-powered aircraft
Reaction Engines aircraft
Supersonic transports
Proposed aircraft of the United Kingdom
Emerging technologies